The Noonday Demon: An Atlas of Depression is a memoir written by Andrew Solomon and first published under the Scribner imprint of New York's Simon & Schuster publishing house in 2001. There was a later paperback under the Touchstone imprint. The Noonday Demon examines the personal, cultural, and scientific aspects of depression through Solomon's published interviews with depression sufferers, doctors, research scientists, politicians, and pharmaceutical researchers.
It is an outgrowth of Solomon's 1998 New Yorker article on depression.

Reception
The Noonday Demon received positive critical response, being described by The New York Times as "a book of remarkable scope, depth, breadth, and vitality."  The book was honored in 2001 with the National Book Award for Nonfiction
and the Lambda Literary Award for autobiography or memoir. In 2002 it was a finalist for the Pulitzer Prize for General Non-Fiction.

In 2019, the memoir was ranked 23rd on The Guardian list of the 100 best books of the 21st century.

Updated edition
A new edition was published by Charles Scribner's Sons in 2015 that added a chapter about new treatments for depression. The update was mentioned during an NPR Fresh Air interview of Solomon and a New York Times article he authored.

References

2001 non-fiction books
American memoirs
Books about depression
Lambda Literary Award-winning works
LGBT autobiographies
National Book Award for Nonfiction winning works
Simon & Schuster books